The 2005 Georgia Bulldogs football team completed the season with a 10–3 record.  Winning 10 games for the fourth year in a row, Georgia tied its own record for consecutive 10 win seasons.  The Bulldogs, with a regular season SEC record of 6–2, won the SEC East and advanced to the 2005 SEC Championship Game.  Georgia beat LSU in the Georgia Dome and went on to represent the SEC in the 2006 Sugar Bowl at the same stadium (a one-time deal due to the Louisiana Superdome being unfit to host that year).  The team lost to West Virginia and finished the season ranked 10th in the polls.  This was the Georgia Bulldogs' fifth season under the guidance of head coach Mark Richt.

Preseason
Coming off a strong 2004 season in which the Bulldogs were ranked No. 6 in the final Coaches Poll, Georgia was ranked No. 13 in the preseason Coaches Poll.  D.J. Shockley was selected as the overall team captain and represented the offense. Max Jean-Gilles was the other offensive captain, Kedric Golston and Greg Blue were the defensive captains and Mike Gilliam was captain of the special teams.

Schedule

Roster

Team

Scores by quarter

References

Georgia
Georgia Bulldogs football seasons
Southeastern Conference football champion seasons
Georgia Bulldogs football